Mine is the debut extended play (EP) by American singer Phoebe Ryan, released on June 9, 2015 by Columbia Records. The album contains two previously released songs, "Mine" and "Dead". Also included was the first song she released as an artist, "Ignition/Do You", a mashup of R. Kelly's "Ignition" and Miguel's "Do You...".

Singles 
 "Ignition/Do You" was released as the first single on January 21, 2015.
 "Mine" was released as the EP's second single on January 27, 2015.
 "Dead" was released as the final single on March 9, 2015.

Critical reception 
Meggie Morris of Renowned for Sound gave the album four out of five stars, writing "Phoebe Ryan's debut sees her join the ranks of several female pop artists that work in the same arena, including Tove Lo, Lights and Ellie Goulding. While this brand of entrancing, lush pop is so popular right now, it’s Ryan’s immaculate songwriting and "innate pop nous" (as described by Noisey) that will help her launch a conspicuous solo career."

Track listing

Release history

References

Columbia Records EPs
2015 EPs